Richard Crawford is an American music historian, formerly a professor of music at the University of Michigan. His American Musical Landscape is one of the seminal works of American music history, published in 2001. He has published a number of other books, and edited a series of books on American music. He is an honorary member and past president of the American Musicological Society, one of the founding members of the Society for American Music, and is the founder and former editor-in-chief of MUSA (Music of the United States of America).

References

External links
Interview with Crawford in Humanities, November/December 1997
Conference Report on the symposium honoring Crawford's retirement in Echo, Spring 2003 
Richard Crawford Bibliography in Echo, Spring 2003

American music historians
American male non-fiction writers
Living people
University of Michigan faculty
Year of birth missing (living people)